The 1929 Chicago Cubs season was the 58th season of the Chicago Cubs franchise, the 54th in the National League and the 14th at Wrigley Field. The Cubs finished first in the National League with a record of 98–54, 10.5 games ahead of the second place Pittsburgh Pirates. The team was defeated four games to one by the Philadelphia Athletics in the 1929 World Series.

Offseason 
 October 3, 1928: Mike Cvengros was drafted by the Cubs from the Wichita Falls Spudders in the 1928 rule 5 draft.
 November 7, 1928: Socks Seibold, Percy Jones, Lou Legett, Freddie Maguire, Bruce Cunningham, and $200,000 were traded by the Cubs to the Boston Braves for Rogers Hornsby.

Regular season 
Rogers Hornsby, who was acquired from the Boston Braves in an offseason deal, had a career year, hitting .380. In the process, he hit 39 home runs with 149 RBIs and led the league with a .679 slugging percentage. The 156 runs scored by Hornsby in 1929 were the most by a right-handed batter in the National League during the 20th century. Hornsby collected his second Most Valuable Player award that year, and for the second time he won a National League pennant.

Season standings

Record vs. opponents

Roster

Player stats

Batting

Starters by position 
Note: Pos = Position; G = Games played; AB = At bats; H = Hits; Avg. = Batting average; HR = Home runs; RBI = Runs batted in

Other batters 
Note: G = Games played; AB = At bats; H = Hits; Avg. = Batting average; HR = Home runs; RBI = Runs batted in

Pitching

Starting pitchers 
Note: G = Games pitched; IP = Innings pitched; W = Wins; L = Losses; ERA = Earned run average; SO = Strikeouts

Other pitchers 
Note: G = Games pitched; IP = Innings pitched; W = Wins; L = Losses; ERA = Earned run average; SO = Strikeouts

Relief pitchers 
Note: G = Games pitched; W = Wins; L = Losses; SV = Saves; ERA = Earned run average; SO = Strikeouts

1929 World Series 

AL Philadelphia Athletics (4) vs. NL Chicago Cubs (1)

Awards and honors

Records 
 Rogers Hornsby, National League record, Most runs by a second baseman, (156).

Farm system

References

External links
1929 Chicago Cubs season at Baseball Reference

Chicago Cubs seasons
Chicago Cubs season
National League champion seasons
Chicago Cubs